Sivanadan Somasekaran also known as  Brigadier Bhanu or Banu was a Senior Commander of the LTTE. He led the LTTE's artillery unit in the Second Battle of Elephant Pass and hoisted the LTTE flag at the Elephant Pass base in 2000. He was also commander of the Kutty Sri mortar brigade.

References

Liberation Tigers of Tamil Eelam members
Sri Lankan Tamil rebels
Possibly living people
Year of birth missing